Labeobarbus rocadasi is a species of cyprinid fish that occurs in the Nyong River in Cameroon and in the Quanza and Lucala rivers in Angola.

References 

Cypriniformes
Fish of Africa
Taxa named by George Albert Boulenger
Fish described in 1910